The Bishop of Brechin is the ecclesiastical head of the Diocese of Brechin or Angus, based at Dundee. Brechin Cathedral, Brechin is a parish church of the established (presbyterian) Church of Scotland. The diocese had a long-established Gaelic monastic community which survived into the 13th century. The clerical establishment may very well have traced their earlier origins from Abernethy. During the Scottish Reformation, the Presbyterian Church of Scotland gained control of the heritage and jurisdiction of the bishopric. However, the line of bishops has continued to this day, according to ancient models of consecration, in the Scottish Episcopal Church.

List of known abbots

List of bishops

Pre-Reformation bishops

Church of Scotland bishops

Episcopal bishops
Today the bishop is the Ordinary of the Scottish Episcopal Diocese of Brechin.

References
Broun, Dauvit, "The Seven Kingdoms in De Situ Albanie: A Record of Pictish political geography or imaginary Map of ancient Alba", in E.J. Cowan & R. Andrew McDonald (eds.), Alba: Celtic Scotland in the Medieval Era, (Edinburgh, 2000, rev. 2005), pp. 24–42
Dowden, John, The Bishops of Scotland, ed. J. Maitland Thomson, (Glasgow, 1912)
Keith, Robert, An Historical Catalogue of the Scottish Bishops: Down to the Year 1688, (London, 1924)
Watt, D.E.R., Fasti Ecclesiae Scotinanae Medii Aevi ad annum 1638, 2nd Draft, (St Andrews, 1969)

External links
Dauvit Broun's list of 12th century Scottish Bishops

 
 
Christianity in Dundee
Diocese of Brechin (Episcopal)